Solyonoye Zaymishche is a rural locality (a selo) in Chernoyarsky District, Astrakhan Oblast, Russia. The population was 2,257 as of 2010. There are 53 streets.

Geography 
Solyonoye Zaymishche is located 19 km south of Chyorny Yar (the district's administrative centre) by road. Grachi is the nearest rural locality.

References 

Rural localities in Chernoyarsky District